WDLP-LP (93.1 FM) was a radio station licensed to Belding, Michigan, United States. The station was owned by Montcalm Public Radio.

References

External links
 

DLP-LP
DLP-LP
Radio stations established in 1994
1994 establishments in Michigan
DLP-LP
Defunct radio stations in the United States